Willmar is a city in, and the county seat of, Kandiyohi County, Minnesota, United States.  The population was 21,015 at the 2020 census.

History
Agricultural expansion and the establishment of Willmar as a division point on the Great Northern Railway determined its growth. The first settlers arrived during the 1850s, attracted to the fertile land and an abundance of timber and game. The Dakota War of 1862 left the township abandoned for several years. The advent of the railroad in Kandiyohi County in 1869 brought new settlers. Many were of Swedish and Norwegian origin; residents of Scandinavian heritage are still a majority. In 1870, Leon (Chadwick) Willmar, a Belgian acting as an agent for the European bondholder of the St. Paul and Pacific Railroad, purchased the title to Section 1 of Willmar Township. Willmar was established as the county seat in 1871 and was incorporated as a village in 1874 and as a city in 1901.

Willmar was the site of a bank robbery by the Machine Gun Kelly gang on July 15, 1930. They robbed the Bank of Willmar (later Bremer Bank) of about $70,000 and wounded three people.

The Willmar Memorial Auditorium, designed by architect William Ingemann, was the largest assembly hall within 70 miles when completed in 1938. It was funded by the city of Willmar and state and federal governments as a Depression-era works project. It contains several murals by Richard Haines commissioned by the Federal Art Project, and wood paneling in the oak doors by WPA artists. It is on the National Register of Historic Places. 

From 1977 to 1979, Willmar was the site of the Willmar 8, a strike of female workers confronting sexual discrimination at a local bank. The story of the strike was reported in mainstream media and made into a documentary.

The music of Willmar native Bradley Joseph draws inspiration from his childhood there, and his company, Robbins Island Music, is named after a Willmar city park.

Willmar was home to the annual Sonshine Festival, a Christian music festival, from 1982 to 2014.

Geography

The 45° latitude line passes just south of Willmar, placing it approximately halfway between the equator and the North Pole.

Climate

Demographics

2010 census
As of the census of 2010, there were 19,610 people, 7,677 households, and 4,538 families living in the city. The racial makeup of the city was 86.9% White, 4.8% African American, 0.5% Native American, 0.6% Asian, 0.1% Pacific Islander, 5.4% from other races, and 1.8% from two or more races. Hispanic or Latino of any race were 20.9% of the population.

There were 7,677 households, of which 30.5% had children under the age of 18 living with them, 42.6% were married couples living together, 12.2% had a female householder with no husband present, 4.3% had a male householder with no wife present, and 40.9% were non-families. 32.4% of all households were made up of individuals, and 12.4% had someone living alone who was 65 years of age or older. The average household size was 2.43 and the average family size was 3.10.

The median age in the city was 33.8 years. 25.2% of residents were under the age of 18; 12.7% were between the ages of 18 and 24; 24.1% were from 25 to 44; 22.2% were from 45 to 64; and 15.8% were 65 years of age or older. The gender makeup of the city was 48.8% male and 51.2% female.

2000 census
As of the census of 2000, there were 18,351 people, 7,302 households, and 4,461 families living in the city. The racial makeup of the city was 88.12% White, 0.90% African American, 0.46% Native American, 0.53% Asian, 0.11% Pacific Islander, 8.52% from other races, and 1.36% from two or more races. Hispanic or Latino of any race were 15.86% of the population.

There were 7,302 households, out of which 31.3% had children under the age of 18 living with them, 47.3% were married couples living together, 10.0% had a female householder with no husband present, and 38.9% were non-families. 31.2% of all households were made up of individuals, and 12.7% had someone living alone who was 65 years of age or older. The average household size was 2.44 and the average family size was 3.08.

In the city, the population was spread out, with 26.2% under the age of 18, 12.0% from 18 to 24, 26.4% from 25 to 44, 19.0% from 45 to 64, and 16.4% who were 65 years of age or older. The median age was 34 years. For every 100 females, there were 91.0 males. For every 100 females age 18 and over, there were 86.6 males.

The median income for a household in the city was $33,455, and the median income for a family was $45,415. Males had a median income of $31,575 versus $22,158 for females. The per capita income for the city was $18,515. About 8.4% of families and 13.1% of the population were below the poverty line, including 16.2% of those under the age of 18 and 8.0% of those 65 and older.

Immigration
Since 1989, Willmar has had a large influx of immigrants from Latin America and Northeast Africa, mostly due to the demand for labor at the Jennie-O poultry plant. In 2001, the city was recognized as an "All America City" by the National Civic League, in part for its success as growing numbers of immigrants became part of the community.

In 2005, the city received attention from national media after several Somali-American high school students gave Willmar High School its first cross-country state championship in 20 years. The team won the state tournament and attended the Nike Nationals consecutively in 2005 and 2006. Following its success, the city gained attention from Sports Illustrated. Subsequently, NBC Nightly News ran a story on Willmar's changing complexion and its acceptance of its new citizens.

More national attention was received when an opinion piece about immigration and Willmar by Thomas Friedman appeared in the New York Times on May 14, 2019.

Education
Willmar is home to Ridgewater College, a community and technical college on the site of a former military base. It has a sister college in Hutchinson. Ridgewater enrolls over 5,500 students and provides a moderate range of programs, in addition to providing access to some four-year programs through relationships with universities in the MnSCU system.

Transportation
U.S. Highways 12 and 71 and Minnesota State Highways 23 and 40 are four of the main routes in the city.

The development of Willmar benefited greatly from being situated at the junction of multiple railway lines. From Willmar, the Great Northern Railway had lines radiating east to Minneapolis and St. Paul, northwest to Fargo and Seattle, northeast to St. Cloud and Duluth, and southwest to Sioux Falls and Yankton. Willmar was served by numerous passenger trains over the years. The last passenger train left Willmar station in 1979.

Sports

Media

Newspapers
West Central Tribune
La Gran America (Trilingual newspaper)

Magazines
Seasons of Minnesota

Television stations
UHF-TV Inc.
WRAC TV - Regional Access Channel

Broadcast

Pay television services
Charter Communications
DirecTV
Dish Network

Radio stations

Notable people

Thomas K. Berg – politician and lawyer
Wallace Gustafson – lawyer and politician
Bonnie Henrickson – head women's college basketball coach at UC Santa Barbara 
Roy C. Jensen – farmer and politician
Dean Johnson – politician
Robert George Johnson – politician
Carl O. Jorgenson – politician
Bradley Joseph – composer and recording artist
Pinky Nelson – astronaut
Alec G. Olson – politician
Earl B. Olson – founder of the Jennie-O Turkey company
Kenneth L. Olson – United States Army soldier
Henrik Shipstead – politician
Curt Swan – illustrator of Superman comics from the 1950s to the 1980s
Rick Swenson – dog musher and Iditarod participant
Alan Welle – politician and businessman
Henry G. Young – lawyer and politician

Sister cities

 Frameries, Belgium
 Vileyka, Belarus

References

External links

Official Website
The Official Willmar Lakes Area Community site
The Official Willmar Lakes Area Chamber of Commerce
Official website of the Willmar Public School District

 
Cities in Kandiyohi County, Minnesota
Cities in Minnesota
County seats in Minnesota
1870 establishments in Minnesota